The 2011 Miami-Dade County mayoral recall election was a recall election that saw the voters of Miami-Dade County, Florida vote to remove mayor of Miami-Dade County Carlos Álvarez from office.

The election was held coincidingly with a vote that also saw Miami-Dade county commissioner Natacha Seihjas also successfully recalled.

In terms of population, the county was considered the largest United States municipality to recall its executive. The county was also, at the time, the second-largest recall vote of any kind in the United States, after the 2003 California gubernatorial recall election.

Months after the vote, a special election was held to fill the vacant mayoralty.

Background
The recall effort against Mayor Álvarez began in late-September 2011, shortly after the Miami-Dade County Board of County Commissioners passed a budget which both raised property taxes and increased the salaries of county employees. The property tax increase was harshly received by voters of the county, who were still notably reeling from the impact of the Great Recession.

The recall effort was led and financially-backed by billionaire Norman Braman.

Election results

References

Miami-Dade County 2011
2011 recall
Miami-Dade recall
Miami-Dade recall